Balangkayan (IPA: [ˌbalaŋˈkajan]), officially the Municipality of Balangkayan, is a 5th class municipality in the province of Eastern Samar, Philippines. According to the 2020 census, it has a population of 10,185 people.

Geography

Barangays
Balangkayan is politically subdivided into 15 barangays.
 Balogo
 Bangon
 Cabay
 Caisawan
 Cantubi
 General Malvar
 Guinpoliran
 Julag
 Magsaysay
 Maramag
 Poblacion I
 Poblacion II
 Poblacion III
 Poblacion IV
 Poblacion V

Climate

Demographics

Economy

Tourism

The Minasangay Island Marine Ecological Park and Resort known for its cliff diving, scuba diving, mangroves and coral reefs is a popular gateway for the locals of the province.

Education

Balangkayan has many elementary schools and a lone high school.

Elementary schools:
 Balangkayan Central Elementary School
 Balogo Elementary School
 Cabay Elementary School
 Caisawan Elementary School
 Guinpoliran Elementary School
 Maramag Elementary School
 Talisay Elementary School

Secondary school:
 Balangkayan National High School

References

External links
 [ Philippine Standard Geographic Code]
 Philippine Census Information
 Local Governance Performance Management System

Municipalities of Eastern Samar